Orión Point is an ice-free point on the north coast of Greenwich Island in the South Shetland Islands, Antarctica forming the east side of the entrance to Guayaquil Bay.  The feature is named after the Ecuadorian Antarctic Expedition's ship Orión.

Location

Maps
 L.L. Ivanov et al. Antarctica: Livingston Island and Greenwich Island, South Shetland Islands. Scale 1:100000 topographic map. Sofia: Antarctic Place-names Commission of Bulgaria, 2005.
 L.L. Ivanov. Antarctica: Livingston Island and Greenwich, Robert, Snow and Smith Islands. Scale 1:120000 topographic map.  Troyan: Manfred Wörner Foundation, 2009.

References
 SCAR Composite Antarctic Gazetteer.

Headlands of Greenwich Island